Lafayette in the Somewhat United States is a 2015 non-fiction book written by Sarah Vowell about the travels of the American and French revolutionary Marquis de Lafayette in early America.

See also
 1824-1825 Grand Tour of the United States
 1824 New York City parade
 1824 Philadelphia parade
 Hero of Two Worlds: The Marquis de Lafayette in the Age of Revolution (2021) by Mike Duncan

References

2015 non-fiction books
American history books
Books by Sarah Vowell
English-language books
Gilbert du Motier, Marquis de Lafayette
Riverhead Books books